The 14th Pan American Games were held in Santo Domingo, Dominican Republic from August 1 to August 17, 2003.

Medals

Bronze

Women's 400 m Hurdles: Andrea Blackett

Results by event

Athletics

Track

Swimming

Men's Competition

See also
 Barbados at the 2004 Summer Olympics

References

Nations at the 2003 Pan American Games
P
2003